Fatima Boussora (born 3 July 1983) is an Algerian handball player for HBC El Biar and the Algerian national team.

References

1983 births
Living people
Algerian female handball players
21st-century Algerian people